The 1984–85 season was Newport County's fifth consecutive season in the Third Division and their 57th season overall in the Football League.

Season review

Results summary 
Note: Three points for a win

Results by round

Fixtures and results

Third Division

FA Cup

Football League Cup

Welsh Cup

League table

External links
 Newport County 1984-1985 : Results
 Newport County football club match record: 1985
 WELSH CUP 1984/85

1984-85
Newport County
Welsh football clubs 1984–85 season